Allister or Allster is a surname of Scottish origin.

Allister or Allster is the surname of:

People
 Claud Allister (1888–1970), English actor born William Claud Michael Palmer
 Donald Allister (born 1952), Church of England bishop
 Jack Allister (Australian footballer) (1919–1946)
 Jack Allister (Scottish footballer) (1927–1999)
 Jean Allister (1932–2012), opera singer from Northern Ireland
 Jessica Allister (born 1982), American softball coach and former catcher
 Jim Allister (born 1953), Ulster loyalist politician and barrister from Northern Ireland

Fictional Character
 Flay Allster, a fictional character from Mobile Suit Gundam SEED

 George Allster, a fictional character from Mobile Suit Gundam SEED

See also
 McAllister (surname), a Scottish surname

Surnames of Scottish origin